Wildalpen is a municipality in the district of Liezen in the Austrian state of Styria.

Population

References

Cities and towns in Liezen District